Consejo is a village in the north of Corozal District, Belize. Consejo is located on a point of land where the bays of Corozal and Chetumal meet.

It also features a subdivision/neighborhood of waterfront or near waterfront homes named Consejo Shores.

References

Populated places in Corozal District
Belize–Mexico border crossings